Matija Frigan (born 11 February 2003) is a Croatian footballer currently playing as a forward for HNK Rijeka.

Early life
Frigan started his career with HNK Rijeka, and was a prolific striker for their youth sides.

Career statistics

Club

Notes

References

2003 births
Living people
Footballers from Rijeka
Association football forwards
Croatian footballers
Croatia youth international footballers
HNK Rijeka players
HNK Orijent players
NK Hrvatski Dragovoljac players
First Football League (Croatia) players
Croatian Football League players